is a railway station on the Iida Line in the city of Ina, Nagano Prefecture, Japan, operated by Central Japan Railway Company (JR Central).

Lines
Inashi Station is served by the Iida Line and is 178.0 kilometers from the starting point of the line at Toyohashi Station.

Station layout
The station consists of two ground-level opposed side platforms connected by a footbridge. The station is staffed.

Platforms

Adjacent stations

History
It was renamed Inashi on 10 November 1954 when Ina was elevated from town to city status. With the privatization of Japanese National Railways (JNR) on 1 April 1987, the station came under the control of JR Central.

Passenger statistics
In fiscal 2015, the station was used by an average of 1192 passengers daily (boarding passengers only).

Surrounding area
The station is located in the centre of the city of Ina, close by the city hall, banks and commercial centre.

See also
 List of railway stations in Japan

References

External links

 Inashi Station information 

Railway stations in Nagano Prefecture
Railway stations in Japan opened in 1912
Stations of Central Japan Railway Company
Iida Line
Ina, Nagano